The Pool of London is a 1906 work by French artist André Derain. It is in the collection of Tate Modern. At the suggestion of Ambroise Vollard, Derain travelled to London to paint works that reflected the popularity of Claude Monet's earlier London series.  The painting depicts the Pool of London, a stretch of the River Thames, as seen from London Bridge.
The painting was one of a number of works featured in the Courtauld Gallery's 2006 exhibition "André Derain: The London Paintings"

References

1906 paintings